Bonjour Balwyn is a 1971 Australian independent film directed by Nigel Buesst and starring John Duigan, Peter Cummins, and John Romeril. It was one of the most notable films of the "Carlton Wave" of filmmaking.

Premise
Kevin Agar is a Carlton-based owner of a fledgling magazine who struggles to make ends meet. As his financial situation turns desperate, he finds work assisting a television repair man with repossessions. Agar's parents live in the suburb of Balwyn.

Cast
 John Duigan as Kevin Agar
 Peter Cummins as TV repairman
 John Romeril as Alan
 Patricia Condon as secretary
 Barbara Stephens as Christine
 Reg Newson as theatre producer
 Camilla Rountree as Rhonda
 Marcel Cugola
 Jim Nicholas
 Alan Finney
 Peter Carmody
 Geoff Gardener

Production
Bonjour Balwyn was shot on 16mm with funds from the Experimental Film and Television Fund. The original running time was 70 minutes but it was cut down to under an hour to qualify for the short fiction competition at the Sydney Film Festival.

The film was not seen widely outside Melbourne.

See also
Cinema of Australia
Australian films of 1971

References

External links
 
Bonjour Balwyn at Australian Screen Online
Bonjour Balwyn at Oz Movies

1971 films
Australian comedy films
Australian independent films
1970s English-language films
Films directed by Nigel Buesst
1970s Australian films